Leslie Roy 'Bunny' Algie (1889–1946) was an Australian rugby league footballer who played in the 1910s.

Background
Algie was born at Glebe, New South Wales in 1889.

Playing career
Algie played  for the Glebe Dirty Reds between 1910-1914. He played 55 first grade games for Glebe and was a prolific point scorer. 'Bunny' Algie scored  24 tries, 28 goals and 3 field goals (total 134 points) during his career at Glebe. He was also the NSWRFL season top try scorer in 1912.

Algie finished his career at Balmain, playing one season in 1916.

Algie died on 24 January 1946.

References

1889 births
1946 deaths
Australian rugby league players
Glebe rugby league players
Balmain Tigers players
Rugby league players from Sydney
New South Wales rugby league team players
Rugby league fullbacks
Date of birth missing